The Kilmuckridge-Tinnaberna Sandhills are a system of clay cliffs, sand dunes, wet woodland, and gently undulating fixed dunes, known as sand hills, in County Wexford, Ireland. The area was surveyed and described during the 1990s and was designated a Special Area of Conservation. The site was considered to be the best example of grey dunes for lichen diversity in the country.

Damage

As at 2011 the National Parks and Wildlife Service is attempting to reverse degradation of a large portion of the site (11 ha) that has been damaged by overgrazing and bulldozing.  Human-induced damage was first reported to the authorities in 2002. Damage continued for a further eight years before the area was made subject to a Ministerial Direction to restore it to its prior condition, issued under relevant Irish legislation.

References

External links
Photographs of undamaged and damaged areas.

Dunes of the Republic of Ireland
Protected areas of County Wexford
Special Areas of Conservation in the Republic of Ireland